Aarno Henrik Maliniemi (surname until 1930 Malin; 9 May 1892 – 8 October 1972) was a Finnish historian, professor in church history at Helsinki University 1945–1960.

Maliniemi was an expert on the medieval church. He studied early Finnish literature, and was editor of a number of publications and bibliographies.

Maliniemi was born in Oulu. He was awarded a doctor honoris causa by University of Uppsala in 1952 and by University of St Andrews in 1960. He died in Helsinki, aged 80.

Bibliography 
 Der Heiligenkalender Finnlands (1925)
 Studier i Vadstena klosters bibliotek (1926)
 S.G. Elmgrenin muistiinpanot (1939)
 De Sancto Henrico (1942)
 Birgittalaisuudesta sekä kohtia Naantalin luostarin historiasta (1943)
 Zur Kenntnis des Breviarium Aboense (1957)

References

External links 
 Biografiakeskus: Photo Aarno Maliniemi

1892 births
20th-century Finnish historians
1972 deaths
People from Oulu